Cairo Exit (El Khoroug) is a feature-length film directed by Hesham Issawi whose production started in Cairo, Egypt, in 2010.

Plot

The story of Cairo Exit takes place in a small town in the outskirts of Cairo, Dar El Salaam, a city inhabited by mostly lower-class, working-class Egyptians. From ancient times until the 1960s this was very fertile land but is now slums.

The town is close to Maadi, an upper-class neighbourhood that locals call "the American Neighbourhood". The Nile runs through it. The city is one of the many slums that surround Cairo. In 20 minutes a person can leave old Cairo, the slums of Cairo that look like a medieval places to Zamalak or Maddi with their westernized hotels, houses and internet cafes. It is precisely the journey of the main character, Amal, through Cairo from the slums, to modern Cairo, to Coptic and Islamic Cairo.

This journey in the bewildering chaos of the city, the visual turmoil and disorder of colour is all part of the frame in Cairo Exit.  In this story everyone wants to leave and everyone has a secret of his or her own. Cairo is a city of layers, ancient civilizations crumbled over each other, covered by modern way of life.

The challenge is to capture the light and dark contrasts of the city with fresh eyes— to create a visceral, immediate experience for audiences, immersing them in the sweltering heat and small alleyways.  Since we're shooting in the heart of the city's infamous but rarely explored slums, capturing their energy and urgency on-the-fly, with an unforced realism.

By using a hand-held camera to reflect the urgency of the city, the disorder of details and to activate the perception of loneliness for the characters. With a distilled narrative and a closely attentive camera, the story offer up characters, often members of what might be called the struggling classes, who are humanized through their daily choices.

Though the film is scrupulously naturalistic, in lighting, camera work, sound design, still somehow it belongs to the suspense genre, though it is suspense of character, not of plot. It is not so much a question of what will happen next, as of how the characters arrive, or fail to arrive, at a decision to act.

The Camera and the natural lighting will capture the rhythms of life and the raw reality of the streets. Using caressing natural light, early morning breath, orange tone for the city, dusty green for the in doors locations like the house of Amal. Earthy colours from most of the characters and capturing the neon blue, red and green lights that sweep Cairo at night.

The whole film is a constant discovery, each new image striking our eye in a fresh way; the impression unfolds before us. Another key feature is the moving between indoors and out doors location, completely objective, where the camera just happened to be.

The main character and the main focal of the story is Amal Iskander  a poor 18-year-old Coptic Egyptian girl. Her Muslim boyfriend Tarek is planning to leave Egypt on an illegal boat-crossing to Italy. Amal tells Tarek she is pregnant but he gives her an ultimatum - abandon the country with him, or have an abortion.

Amal, who loves Tarek and wants the baby, rejects both choices. But when the battered scooter she uses for food deliveries is stolen. Amal is fired from her job and suddenly finds herself with even fewer options. Her future, limited from the start, looks even more uncertain. In the poor neighborhood of Bashtel where Amal lives with her mother and a stepfather who is a compulsive gambler, day-to-day existence is difficult for everyone. Her sister, Hanan, is also an unwed mother with few paths to a better life.

Her best friend, Rania, is trying to raise money for an operation that will disguise the fact that she is no longer a virgin so that she can marry a wealthy, older man whom she does not love. Amal seeks guidance in prayers to the Virgin Mary, but with few real possibilities left, she takes the only job she can find - in a hairdresser with low pay. The new job opens up the underworld life within Cairo that Amal never imagined - a life of luxury, leisure, expensive homes and cars - but also one of vice. At one of her destinations, a high class brothel in an exclusive part of town, she discovers her sister Hanan working as a prostitute in order to support her child. Devastated, disgusted by the life of the underworld, she gives up her only possibility for self-sufficiency.

Neither desiring a loveless marriage like Rania's, nor wishing to end up destitute like her mother and sister, Amal decides that she must abandon her family and their difficult existence in Egypt to join the man she loves and take the risky journey across the sea to another life.

Cast
 Maryhan as Amal
 Mohamed Ramadan as Tarek
 Sana Mouziane as Rania
 Ahmed Bidar as Nagib
 Safa'a Galal as Hanan
 Mohamed Goma as Mahmoud
 Nadia Fahmy as Amal's mother
 Abdul Rahman Masry as Samir
 Kamal Attia as Meena
 Mohamed El Sawy as Abdo
 Nabil El-Hagrassy as Farid - Restaurant owner
 Madgy El Sebay as Restaurant chef
 Ismail Farouk as Gameel Ashry - Marriage councilor
 Maha Osman as Madam Mervat
 Eman Lotfy as Nagwa
 Awatef Helmy as Rania's mother
 Hossam El-Sherbiny as Doctor Samah
 Fifi Mansour as Tarek's mother
 Attia as Rania's father

References

 www.tribecafilm.com/filmguide/cairo_exit-film35460.html
 "Meet the 2011 Tribeca Filmmakers | 'Cairo Exit' Director Hesham Issawi", IndieWire, 22 April 2011
 http://www.incendiaryimage.com/sketchbook/cairo-exit-movie/
 Jeffrey Fleishman, "Director goes off Egypt's script", Los Angeles Times, 4 June 2010
 Katherine Spenley, "Creative struggle to rediscover past glories", The National, 19 December 2010.

External links
 
 

Egyptian drama films
2010 films